The Nigerian Basketball Federation (NBBF) is the governing body for men's and women's basketball in Nigeria.  NBBF has been an affiliate of FIBA Africa since 1963, and its offices are located in Abuja and Lagos.

FIBA competitions
The senior men's Nigerian national basketball team has participated in the FIBA Africa Championship games 17 times, in: 1972, 1978, 1980, 1985, 1987, 1992, 1995, 1997, 1999, 2001, 2003, 2005, 2007, 2009, 2011, 2013, 2015 . Earning one gold, three silver and three bronze metals, and participated twice in the FIBA World Cup, in 1998 and 2006, where they placed 13th and 14th respectively. The last edition of the Africa Championship saw Nigeria national basketball team clinching the gold medal after defeating the dominant Angolan team. This feat has placed the Nigeria national men's basketball team 1st in Africa and 16th in the world ranking while the women national team are placed 6th in Africa and 42nd in the world. This was achieved through painstaking planning of the Board of the federation lead by Tijjani Umar.

Recently, the team has enjoyed success, due to an orchestrated recruitment of American college and professional players of Nigerian descent. A team dominated by Nigerian-Americans qualified for the 2006 FIBA World Championship, marking only the second time in the country's history that they qualified to the FIBA World Cup.

Eight players on the team that represented Nigeria at the 2009 FIBA AfroBasket tournament were born in the United States. Nigeria also qualified to the 2012 Summer Olympics, where their team consisted of 10 Nigerian-Americans, 10 of which were born in the United States.

Other competitions
Nigeria has won several medals at the All-Africa Games, and placed 4th in the 2006 Commonwealth Games, falling short to 3rd place England.

The Nigerian male basketball team D'tigers participated in the 2018 Gold coast common wealth games and lost all games they played.

Afrobasket 2015 Champions

Nigeria's senior men's basketball teams, a.k.a. D’Tigers, are finally the champions of Africa following their exploits at the recently held 2015 Afrobasket Men's Championship in Tunisia from August 19–30, 2015.

The victory we are celebrating today did not come easy as the Tijjani Umar-led Board of the  Nigeria Basketball Federation (NBBF) had to face different hurdles on the way to get to this level which other Boards before it strove to attain.

The road to today's success actually began in 2013 following the second tenure of Tijjani Umar as president of the NBBF. Despite distractions placed on its way, the Board began work in earnest and went for the best players the country had within and outside the shores of the country.

At the Afrobasket in Abidjan, Côte d'Ivoire in 2013, many basketball faithful looked up to Nigeria to break the stranglehold Angola had on the continent's basketball but injuries and other technical factors scuttled that dream.

Not one to take defeat lightly, Umar and his team with contributions from the players, did a self appraisal and came to the conclusion that, the team, with its array of world class players, needed the services of an experienced technical hand to transform the team into the champions they truly are.

That was how, American William Voigt was selected from among the names who applied to tinker the Nigerian team. He too, hungry to succeed on his first assignment in Africa, came along with his own staff to complement the Nigerian assistants provided by the NBBF.

Three players from the Nigerian league, the DStv Men's Basketball League, were among the preliminary team selected to begin camping in Abuja on July 15, 2015, but visa hitches prevented them from joining the team's pre-tournament training in France and Italy where the team participated in invitational tournaments as well as friendly matches.

Painfully though, just when the team was rounding off their training in Italy, the team's pivot, Ike Diogu picked up a calf-muscle injury which eventually ruled him out of the competition.

While some basketball pundits saw this as a setback and actually concluded that Nigeria's dream of becoming African Champions had been shattered, Diogu himself, feeling bad though, told his teammates that he was just one person out of the 12 soldiers going to war, pressing it on them that they were capable of beating every contender to the title.

The turning point for the team was the loss to host country, Tunisia, in the group stage. NBBF president, Umar told the players in the locker room that the loss was a wake-up call for them to gird their loins and play the best basketball of their lives.

From there they never looked back as they took every game in their stride until they met their 2013 nemesis, Senegal who they dispatched in over-time after a grueling game that put the capacity crowd on the edge of their seats.

Now in the final, the players were more fired up to end the reign of the Angolans, who had earlier, on the road to the final, lost to Senegal in the group stage.

Going into the final, the Director-General of the National Sports Commission (NSC), Mallam Al-Hassan Yakmut had confirmed to the NBBF President, that the Vice President, on behalf of the President of the Federal Republic of Nigeria was going to put a call through to the team to wish it good luck on behalf of an expectant nation.

Minutes before the jump-ball in the final, the team received a call from the Vice President, Prof. Yemi Osinbajo, who told the players to believe that they could stop Angola's winning streak and become African champions.

With that message at the back of their mind, like the tigers they truly are, they went into the game, the initial bravado by the Angolans notwithstanding, clawed their way back, point after point, making the perennial champions look ordinary in the process until they were finally dethroned by a nine-point victory for Nigeria at 74–65. Their first in the history of the championship and an Olympic ticket in the kitty.

They have done the great work, beating the dreaded Angolans and clinching a back to back Olympic ticket. The rest is for the people and government of Nigeria to appreciate and reward this historic feat.

Sponsorship Deal
The Nigeria Basketball Federation (NBBF), recently unveiled Econnetmedia, owner of Kwese Sports as the new title sponsor of the Men's Premier Basketball League.
With the formal signing of the agreement and unveiling of the title sponsor, the Men Premier Basketball League which was formerly known as DStv Premier Basketball League, will now be call and known as ‘Kwese Premier Basketball League,

Former NBBF President, Tijjani Umar disclosed this at a press conference in Abuja to unveil the name of the new title sponsor for the league.

Umar said the sponsorship deal is worth $12 million for five years (2017-2021) at a license fee of $2.2 million per season for all NBBF events including the Men's Premier Basketball League.

The $2.2 million per season deal is bigger than the previous four-year deal with DStv which was worth only $1.5 million for the four years duration.

The former  president added that the exclusively broadcasting right of Kwese Premier Basketball League, including the 2017 league season which dunked off in Lagos is now owned by the Kwese Sports Channel.

In April 2018, the Ahmadu Musa Kida led NBBF signed 60 million Naira sponsorship deal for the Nigerian Divisions 1 and 2 male basketball leagues with Total Nigeria limited.

Afrobasket Women 2017

NAMES OF PLAYERS AND COACHES INVITED TO NATIONAL CAMP IN PREPARATION FOR THE AFROBASKET 2017 WOMEN CHAMPIONSHIP IN BAMAKO, MALI.

The Camps will resume on Monday, 24 July 2017 in Orlando, Florida, USA and Lagos, Nigeria respectively. The Foreign Based players will converge in Orlando, Florida while the Home Based with some Foreign Based players holidaying in Nigeria will converge in Lagos, Nigeria on the above stated date.

The Full list of the players and Coaches for the Orlando, Florida, USA and Lagos, Nigeria Camps are as follows:

A. Orlando, Florida, USA Camp

1. Ezinne Kalu

2. Promise Amukamara

3. Adaeze Alaeze

4. Helen Ogunjimi

5. Ayoleka Sodade

6. Ndidi Madu

7. Cecilia Okoye

8. Aisha Mohammed

9. Patience Okpe

10. Sarah Imovbioh

11. Ugo Nwaigwe

12. Balogun Elizabeth

13. Joyce Ekworomadu

14. Evelyn Akhator

COACH

Vincent James Samuel(Sam Vincent)

B. Lagos, Nigeria Camp

1. Sarah Ogoke – Foreign Based

2. Uju Ugoka - Foreign Based

3. Adaora Elonu – Foreign Based

4. Chioma Udeaja – First Bank

5. Nkechi Akashili - First Bank

6. Upe Atosu – First Bank

7. Elawure Tina Odion – First Bank

8. Akaraiwe Nkem – First Bank

9. Ukato Igere Magdalene – First Bank

10. Nwamaka Deborah Chidinma – First Bank

11. Ulabo Queen Roseline - Dolphins

12. Olaosebikan Tokunbo - Dolphins

13. Ume Nwamaka Gloria – Plateau Rocks

14. Okonkwo Grace – IGP Queens

15. Isaac Christiana – IGP Queens

COACHES

1. Peter Favour Ahmedu - First Bank

2. Ochuko Okorogun - Dolphins

Afrobasket Women's champions 2017
The Nigerian female basketball side D'tigress were crowned FIBA 2017 women's Afrobasket after defeating Senegal in the Final.

Nigerian Premier League

The Kwese Premier League (KPL) (basketball)is the top professional basketball league for Men while the Zenith Bank Women's Premier League is the top professional basketball League for Women in Nigeria.

Teams (Kwese Premier League) 
SAVANNAH CONFERENCE
 Bauchi Nets (Bauchi)
 Kano Pillars (basketball) (Kano)
 Gombe Bulls (Gombe)
 Plateau Peaks (Jos)
 Mark Mentors (Abuja)
 Defenders (Abuja)
 Niger Potters(Niger)
 Kada Stars (Kaduna)

ATLANTIC CONFERENCE
 Oluyole Warriors (Ibadan)
 Hoops & Read  (Lagos)
 Royal Hoopers (Rivers)
 NAF Rockets (Lagos)
 Delta Force  (Asaba)
 Nigeria Customs (Lagos)
 Police Baton (Lagos)
 Kwara Falcons (Kwara)

Teams (Zenith Women's League) 

 First Bank (Lagos)
 Dolphins (Lagos)
 1st Deepwater (Lagos)
 Plateau Rocks (Jos)
 FCT Angels (Abuja)
 IGP Queens (Lagos)
 Nigeria Customs(Lagos)
 GT 2000 (Kaduna)
 Oluyole Babes (Ibadan)
 Nasarawa Amazons  (Nasarawa)
 Ekiti Angels (Ekiti)
 Taraba Hurricanes (Taraba)
 Delta Force  (Asaba)
 Coal City Queens (Enugu)
 Zamfara Babes (Zamfara)
 Sunshine Angels (Ondo)
 AHIP (Kano)
 Benue Princess  (Benue)
 Delta Force (Delta)

References

External links
 Nigeria @ AfricaBasket.com
 FIBA.com
 Official AUN Basketball Website

Nigeria
National team
Basketball
Sports organizations established in 1964
Organizations based in Abuja
1964 establishments in Nigeria
Women's sports governing bodies in Nigeria